In biochemistry, the Lineweaver–Burk plot (or double reciprocal plot) is a graphical representation of the Lineweaver–Burk equation of enzyme kinetics, described by Hans Lineweaver and Dean Burk in 1934. The Lineweaver–Burk plot for inhibited enzymes can be compared to no inhibitor to determine how the inhibitor is competing with the enzyme.

The Lineweaver–Burk plot is correct when the enzyme kinetics obey ideal second-order kinetics, however non-linear regression is needed for systems that do not behave ideally. The double reciprocal plot distorts the error structure of the data, and is therefore not the most accurate tool for the determination of enzyme kinetic parameters. While the Lineweaver–Burk plot has historically been used for evaluation of the parameters, together with the alternative linear forms of the Michaelis–Menten equation such as the Hanes-Woolf plot or Eadie–Hofstee plot, all linearized forms of the Michaelis–Menten equation should be avoided to calculate the kinetic parameters. Non-linear regression methods are significantly more accurate and no longer computationally inaccessible.

Definitions for Interpreting Plot 
: substrate concentration. The independent axis of a Lineweaver-Burk plot is the reciprocal of substrate concentration, .

 or : initial velocity of an enzyme-inhibited reaction. The dependent axis of the Lineweaver-Burk plot is the reciprocal of velocity, .

: maximum velocity of the reaction. The y-intercept of the Lineweaver-Burk plot is the reciprocal of maximum velocity, .

: the Michaelis constant, a measure of enzymatic ability. A lower  means less substrate is required to achieve half of the enzymes maximal rate.   is a composite value so is not a direct measure of the affinity of the enzyme for its substrate.  It is often, incorrectly, stated that  is a measure of the affinity of an enzyme for its substrate. Graphically, the x-intercept of the line is 

Kcat: turnover number, or reactions per unit time. The lower the Kcat the slower the reaction. Kcat=Vmax/[Enzyme]. Graphically this can be evaluated by looking at Vmax.

Catalytic Efficiency = Kcat/KM. A fast catalyst and high affinity results in best catalytic efficiency.

Alpha determines the degree that binding of an inhibitor effects enzyme kinetics of a substrate, it always has a positive value.

Derivation
The plot provides a very useful graphical method for analysis of the Michaelis–Menten equation, as it is difficult to determine precisely the Vmax of an enzyme-catalysed reaction:

Taking the reciprocal gives us:

The Lineweaver–Burk plot puts 1/[S] on the x-axis and 1/V on the y-axis.

Applications

When used for determining the type of enzyme inhibition, the Lineweaver–Burk plot can distinguish competitive, pure non-competitive and uncompetitive inhibitors. The various modes of inhibition can be compared to the uninhibited reaction.

Competitive Inhibition 
Vmax is unaffected by competitive inhibitors. Therefore competitive inhibitors have the same y-intercept as uninhibited enzymes (since Vmax is unaffected by competitive inhibitors the inverse of Vmax also doesn't change).

Competitive inhibition increases the KM, or lowers substrate affinity. The KM inhibited is αKM. Graphically this can be seen as the inhibited enzyme having a larger x-intercept. The slopes of competitively inhibited enzymes and non-inhibited enzymes are different. Competitive inhibition is shown on the far left image.

Pure Noncompetitive Inhibition 
With pure noncompetitive inhibition Vmax is lowered with inhibition. Vmax inhibited is αVmax. This can be seen on the Lineweaver–Burk plot as an increased y-intercept with inhibition, as the reciprocal is plotted.

Pure noncompetitive inhibition does not effect substrate affinity, therefore KM remains unchanged. Graphically this can be seen in that enzymes with pure noncompetitive inhibition intersect with non-inhibited enzymes at the x-axis. The slopes of pure noncompetitive inhibited enzymes and non-inhibited enzymes are different. Pure noncompetitive inhibition is shown in the far right image.

Mixed Inhibition 
Pure noncompetitive inhibition is rare, meaning mixed inhibition is more likely to result. In the case of mixed inhibition Vmax and KM are both effected at non-proportional rate. In most cases Vmax is decreased, while KM is increased, meaning affinity usually decreases with mixed inhibition. The lines of mixed inhibition and no inhibition intersect somewhere between the x- axis and y- axis, but never on an axis with mixed inhibition.

Uncompetitive Inhibition 
Vmax decreases with uncompetitive inhibition. Vmax inhibited is  αVmax. This can be seen on the Lineweaver–Burk plot as an increased y-intercept with inhibition, as the reciprocal is plotted. This relationship is seen in both uncompetitive inhibition and pure competitive inhibition.

Substrate affinity increases with uncompetitive inhibition, or lowers KM. The inhibited KM is KM/α. Graphically this means that enzymes with uncompetitive inhibition will have a smaller x-intercept than non inhibited enzymes. Despite the x-intercept and y-intercept of uncompetitive inhibition both changing, the slope remains constant. Graphically uncompetitive inhibition can be identified in that the line of inhibited enzyme is parallel to non-inhibited enzyme. Uncompetitive inhibition is shown in the middle image.

Problems with Lineweaver-Burk 

While the Lineweaver-Burk is useful for determining important variables in enzyme kinetics, it is prone to error. The y-axis of the plot takes the reciprocal of the rate of reaction, meaning small errors in measurement are more noticeable. Additionally, the values derived from low [S] (and hence the more error prone values) are on the far right of the plot and have a larger impact on the slope of the line, and thus in particular on the value of KM.

See also

 Michaelis–Menten kinetics
 Eadie–Hofstee diagram
 Hanes–Woolf plot

References

External links 
 NIH guide, enzyme assay development and analysis

Plots (graphics)
Enzyme kinetics